Vinasse is a byproduct of the sugar or ethanol industry. Sugarcane or sugar beet is processed to produce crystalline sugar, pulp and molasses. The latter are further processed by fermentation to ethanol, ascorbic acid or other products. Juice sugarcane can also be processed directly by ethanol fermentation. After the removal of the desired product (alcohol, ascorbic acid, etc.) the remaining material is called vinasse. Vinasse is sold after a partial  dehydration and usually has a viscosity comparable to molasses. Commercially offered vinasse comes either from sugar cane and is called cane-vinasse or from sugar beet and is called beet-vinasse. Vinasse produced from sugar cane is also called dunder.

In the process of distillation of the alcohol and as a result of the heating in the distillation process, in the pulp of the beet reactions of condensation and predominantly molecular ruptures take place. This causes a high fulvic acid concentration in this byproduct. One use of vinasse is in thermophilic digesters. In Brazil thermophilic digester is a source of biogas using pure and hot vinasse as the source of production of methane. In the past, vinasse was a problem in production of ethanol, but vinasse is also a good fertilizer (at least for some time) and a source of methane that can be used to generate heat or electricity. Moreover, other uses of vinasse involving also the formulation of nutritive solutions for hydroponics, formulation of culture media for plant tissue culture   and culture media for algal growth.

Vinasse composition

Treated vinasse is originated by a decantation and filtration process.

See also 
 Bagasse
 Dunder

References

Further reading 
 Tejada, M., Gonzalez, J.L., 2006. Effects of two beet vinasse forms on soil physical properties and soil loss. Catena 68, 41–50

Sugar
Ethanol fuel